André Oliver (1932 – 22 April 1993) was a French fashion designer, and the long-term business partner and life partner of Pierre Cardin.

Oliver was born in Toulouse in 1932.

Oliver joined Pierre Cardin in 1951, one year after he founded his fashion house, and became "Cardin's right-hand man, friend and fellow creator".

References

1932 births
1993 deaths
French fashion designers
LGBT fashion designers
Businesspeople from Toulouse
French LGBT artists
20th-century French LGBT people